

Wulfhelm (or Wulfehelm; died ) was a medieval Bishop of Hereford. He was consecrated in either 934 or between 937 and 940 and died either in 934 or between 937 and 940.

Citations

References

External links
 

Bishops of Hereford
10th-century deaths
10th-century English bishops
Year of birth unknown